BRL-52537 is a drug which acts as a potent and highly selective κ-opioid agonist. It has neuroprotective effects in animal studies, and is used for research into potential treatments for stroke and heart attack as well as more general brain research.

References

Synthetic opioids
Chlorobenzenes
Acetamides
Piperidines
Pyrrolidines
Kappa-opioid receptor agonists